Abraham Danon (15 August 1857 – 22 April 1925) was a Turkish rabbi, Hebraist, writer, and poet.

Biography
Abraham Danon was born into a rabbinical family in Adrianople, Turkey, in 1857. He attended the Talmud Torah in that city, pursuing his Talmudic studies at a yeshiva. In 1879 he founded the Maskilic society Ḥevrat Shoḥare Tushiyya ('Society of the Proponents of Wisdom'), also known as Dorshe ha-Haskala ('Seekers of Enlightenment'), which promoted the study of Jewish literature and history. After having presided over a small seminary at Adrianople, in 1897 he was appointed director of the rabbinical seminary founded by the Alliance Israélite Universelle in Constantinople. That same year, he went to Paris to represent Oriental Jewry at the Congress of Orientalists. 

Danon moved to Paris, France, in August 1917, and began teaching at that city's . He died there in 1925.

Work
Under the title Toledot bene Abraham, Danon published a Hebrew translation of Théodore Reinach's Histoire des juifs (Presburg, 1888), completing the story, as he says in the preface, by extracts from Graetz, Geiger, Kalman Schulman, and others. Under the title Maskil le-Edan ('Edan's Poem',  abbreviation of 'Abraham Josef Danon'), he published a series of Hebrew translations of the poems of Virgil, Victor Hugo, and Saadi, together with some original contributions (Adrianople, 1888).

Danon's main achievement was his initiative in founding at Adrianople in 1888 the historical review Yosef da'at, or El Progresso, which was published in Hebrew characters in Judæo-Spanish, Hebrew, and Turkish. The aim of the review was to collect all the documents relating to the history of the Oriental Jews. But the Ottoman government censorship suppressed this review, together with all others published in Turkey. 

Danon published a collection of fifty-five Judæo-Spanish ballads which are sung in Turkey, each ballad being accompanied by its French translation. They first appeared in the Revue des études juives, and were published separately by Durlacher in Paris in 1896. Danon also published some studies on the Jews of Adrianople and of Salonica, which appeared in the same review.

Partial bibliography

References
 

1857 births
1925 deaths
20th-century French Jews
Emigrants from the Ottoman Empire to France
French-language writers
Hebraists
Hebrew-language poets
Jewish orientalists
People from Edirne
People of the Haskalah
Translators to Hebrew
Turkish orientalists
Turkish rabbis